George Mears (January 3, 1843 – November 24, 1921) was an American soldier who fought with the Union Army in the American Civil War. Mears received his country's highest award for bravery during combat, the Medal of Honor, for actions taken on July 2, 1863, during the Battle of Gettysburg.

Civil War service
At the onset of the American Civil War, Mears enlisted into Company A of the 6th Pennsylvania Reserve Regiment out of Harrisburg, Pennsylvania. This regiment was also known as the 35th Pennsylvania Infantry.

On the second day of the Battle of Gettysburg, Union forces had been forced to fall back due to the superior numbers of the opposing Confederate force.  As more Union troops arrived to fight however the battle started to shift. In a swampy area west of the John Weikert Farm, Mears, along with Thaddeus S. Smith, John W. Hart, J. Levi Roush, Chester S. Furman and Wallace Johnson volunteered to attack a small log cabin being held by Confederate forces. Although they attempted to approach the cabin by stealth, they were spotted and began taking fire from the enemy force locked inside. Mears and the other men rushed through the enemy fire and forced their way into the cabin. Before they could start shooting the Confederate soldiers surrendered and were taken back to Union lines as prisoners. For their actions during this incident, all six men received the Medal of Honor.

After Gettysburg, Mears fought in the Battle of New Hope Church where he lost his arm.

Medal of Honor citation

Personal life
Following the war, Mears married Mary Appleman with whom he had seven children.

Mears was the first Morse code telegraph operator in Central Pennsylvania, and for fifty years was an employee of the Delaware, Lackawanna and Western Railroad.

References

External links
 George Mears on Find A Grave

1843 births
1921 deaths
American Civil War recipients of the Medal of Honor
People from Bedford County, Pennsylvania
People of Pennsylvania in the American Civil War
United States Army Medal of Honor recipients